The Rafael Overhead Weapon Station is a remote weapon station developed by Rafael Advanced Defense Systems in cooperation with the Israel Defense Forces. It has been superseded by the Rafael Samson Remote Controlled Weapon Station (RCWS). However, the larger Rafael OWS-25 and OWS-25R models are still in production.

Users
The OWS is used on:
IDF Achzarit
IDF Puma
M113A2 Ultra OWS
Otokar Akrep
Otokar Cobra
Otokar Yavuz
 Romanian Army MLI-84M

Variants
OWS-25 - Carries 25mm auto cannon, 7.62 mm coaxial machine gun and smoke grenade launchers.  

OWS-25R - Carries 25mm auto cannon, 2 anti-tank missiles and 7.62 mm coaxial machine gun.
The Rafael OWS-25R adds  to a vehicle's weight.

Sources

Vehicle weapons
Rafael Advanced Defense Systems
Remote weapon stations